Miss USA 1979 was the 28th Miss USA pageant, televised live by CBS from the Gulf Coast Convention Center in Biloxi, Mississippi on April 30, 1979.

The pageant was won by Mary Therese Friel of New York, who was crowned by outgoing titleholder Judi Andersen of Hawaii.  Friel was the second woman from New York to win the Miss USA title, and went on to place as a semi-finalist at Miss Universe 1979.

Results

Final Competition

Special awards

Preliminary Swimsuit

Historical significance 

 New York wins competition for the second time.
 Washington earns the 1st runner-up position for the first time and reached its highest placement since Dorothy Anstett won in 1968.
 Hawaii earns the 2nd runner-up position for the first time and reached its highest placement since Judi Andersen won in the previous year.
 Illinois earns the 3rd runner-up position for the second time. The last time it placed this was in 1958. Also it was reached its highest placement since Karen Morrison won in 1974.
 Mississippi earns the 4th runner-up position for the first time and surpasses its previous highest placement in 1964, becoming its highest placement of the state.
 States that placed in semifinals the previous year were California, Hawaii, Massachusetts, Texas and Virginia.
 California placed for the twenty-third consecutive year. This is the longest streak of placements that a state has hold ever. 
 Texas placed for the fifth consecutive year. 
 Hawaii and Virginia placed for the third consecutive year. 
 Massachusetts made its second consecutive placement.
 Arizona last placed in 1977.
 Illinois and Washington last placed in 1976.
 North Carolina last placed in 1975.
 New York and Wisconsin last placed in 1974.
 Mississippi last placed in 1964.
 New Mexico breaks an ongoing streak of placements since 1976.

Delegates
The Miss USA 1979 delegates were:

 Alabama - Rose Burch
 Alaska - Kim Fidler
 Arizona - Ana Maria Rubert
 Arkansas - Cynthia Caldwell
 California - Linda Fogarty
 Colorado - Jene Nelson
 Connecticut - Mary Beth Lombardi
 Delaware - Lisa Toothman
 District of Columbia - Cynthia Ramsay
 Florida - Penny Sheridan
 Georgia - Debbie Freeman
 Hawaii - Leialoha Ma'a
 Idaho - Lori Jukich
 Illinois - Debra Niego
 Indiana - Debbie Hayes
 Iowa - Teri Rees
 Kansas - Linda Shields
 Kentucky - Linda Passmore
 Louisiana - Lisa Anderson
 Maine - Valerie Crooker
 Maryland - Jean Bourne
 Massachusetts - Monica Magnus
 Michigan - Susan James
 Minnesota - Cynthia Lee
 Mississippi - Laurie Kimbrough
 Missouri - Virginia Dean
 Montana - Jurette Sindelar
 Nebraska - Rhonda Lundberg
 Nevada - Aleasha Magleby
 New Hampshire - Patricia Brous
 New Jersey - Robin Senatore
 New Mexico - Michele Sandoval
 New York - Mary Therese Friel
 North Carolina - Dianne Jamerson
 North Dakota - Renae Hermanson
 Ohio - Carolyn Houlihan
 Oklahoma - Susan Gibson
 Oregon - Katie Fitzpatrick
 Pennsylvania - Maureen Starinsky
 Rhode Island - Theresa Patterson
 South Carolina - Janice McDonald
 South Dakota - Noelle de Saint Gall
 Tennessee - Sandy Nuismer
 Texas - Anne Hinnant
 Utah - Vicky Scott
 Vermont - Kathi Rechsteiner
 Virginia - Betsy Bott
 Washington - Tracey Goddard
 West Virginia - Candy Boggs
 Wisconsin - Kathryn Joy Wituschek
 Wyoming - Pam Williams

Judges
Maud Adams
Jim Davis
Eileen Ford
Beverly Garland
Alfred Allan Lewis
Leslie Nielsen
Kimberly Tomes

External links 
 

1979
April 1979 events in the United States
1979 beauty pageants
1979 in Mississippi
Biloxi, Mississippi